The 2022 Pan American Judo Championships were held in Lima, Peru from 15 to 17 April 2022. This edition of the Pan American Judo Championships was combined with the Oceania Judo Championships.

Medal table

Results

Men's events

Women's events

Mixed event

References

External links
 

2022
2022
American Championships
2022 Pan American Judo Championships
2022 Pan American Judo Championships
2022 in Peruvian sport
April 2022 sports events in South America